Maharahj was a metalcore band from Oakville, Ontario. Their name originated from a modified spelling of the East Indian term maharaja. This now defunct band was founded in 1997 by Garren and Clay under the original name One Winged Angel. Over the course five years, the band released one demo and two full length studio albums. After heated discussion about the viability of full-time tour support, they disbanded in 2002. Members went on to start bands Explode the Airwaves and Silverstein.

History

During their first US tour, label owner Matt Beckerman signed Maharahj to his (now defunct) nowornever records. Sharing the stage with such label-mates as The Dillinger Escape Plan and Diecast, Maharahj found underground scene success with their blend of discordance and mathematical technicality. The studio recording full length "Chapter One, The Descent" embodied the bands raw talent, angst and grit. With a major label financial backing the record, Maharahj was able to gain a respectable fan base amidst a growing 90's metalcore scene. Regardless, the rigorous demands of the touring, egos and difficult musicianship had their toll on some of the members.

In 2001, the heavy-handed nature of the band's internal songwriting process created some dramatic lineup changes. Colin and Andrew were recruited to replace Jon and Neil. Neil went on to join and play in the successful band Silverstein. Progressing as a more diverse band with varying musical interests, Maharahj recorded the sophomore effort Repetition. Despite the earnest effort, the album was not as well received as they had hoped. Poor tour support and differing egos was also a contributing factor. One year later, the band split ways.

Major label signing
Maharahj signed to Nowornever Records in June 1999. The band recorded both their full-length debut CD Chapter One, The Descent and sophomore effort Repetition on the Nowornever label at Signal to Noise studios in Toronto Ontario.

Members
Vocals - Garren Ustel
Guitar - Colin Ross
Guitar - Clayton Kelly
Bass - Andrew Bricker
Drums - Dave Johnston

Former members
Guitar-Neil Boshart

Discography
A Replication of a Process and Product (EP) (September 1999)
Chapter One, The Descent (LP) (August 2000)
Repetition (LP) (September 2001)

See also
List of bands from Canada
Silverstein (band)

External links
Maharahj on bandcamp.com

Musical groups established in 1997
Musical groups disestablished in 2002
Canadian metalcore musical groups
Musical groups from the Regional Municipality of Halton
1997 establishments in Ontario
2002 disestablishments in Ontario